Alessandro Romeo (born 19 January 1987 in Rome) is an Italian footballer who plays for Trapani.

External links
 

Italian footballers
U.C. Sampdoria players
A.C. Legnano players
Cavese 1919 players
Ascoli Calcio 1898 F.C. players
Serie A players
Serie B players
Association football forwards
1987 births
Living people